Wang Mengjie (born ) is a Chinese volleyball player. She is part of the China women's national volleyball team. On club level she played for Shandong in 2015.

She was part of the China team in 2017 who took part in the FIVB Volleyball World Grand Prix in Macao. The team who included Zhu Ting, Qian Jingwen, Zheng Yixin, Wang Yunlu played against the USA, Turkey and Italy. The final part of the competition was in Nanjing in China where the team came fourth.

Clubs
  Shandong (2013–present)
  Sichuan (2017) (loaned)
  Zhejiang (2018) (loaned)

References

1995 births
Living people
Chinese women's volleyball players
Volleyball players from Shandong
Place of birth missing (living people)
Sportspeople from Jinan
Liberos
Asian Games gold medalists for China
Asian Games medalists in volleyball
Medalists at the 2018 Asian Games
Volleyball players at the 2018 Asian Games
Volleyball players at the 2020 Summer Olympics
Olympic volleyball players of China
21st-century Chinese women